Orthonotus is a genus of plant bugs belonging to the family Miridae.

Species
Orthonotus creticus Wagner, 1974
Orthonotus cylindricollis (A. Costa, 1853)
Orthonotus fraudatrix (Reuter, 1904)
Orthonotus graecus Rieger, 1985
Orthonotus longiceps (Reuter, 1883)
Orthonotus magnieni Matocq, 2002
Orthonotus ponticus (Horvath, 1888)
Orthonotus pseudoponticus Josifov, 1964
Orthonotus rossicus (Reuter, 1878)
Orthonotus rufifrons (Fallen, 1807)

References

Miridae genera
Phylinae